The 2008 Indonesian Speedcar Series round was a Speedcar Series motor race held on 16 and 17 February 2008 at Sentul International Circuit in Sentul, Indonesia. It was the second round of the 2008 Speedcar Series.

Classification

Qualifying

Race 1

Race 2

See also 
 2008 Indonesian GP2 Asia Series round

References

Speedcar Series